Seagate or Sea Gate may refer to:
 
 Sea gate, a channel or waterway which gives access to the ocean
 Sea-gate, a castle drawbridge

Locations

In the United States
 Sea Gate, Brooklyn, a gated community in New York
 SeaGate Convention Centre in Toledo, Ohio
 Seagate (Manatee County, Florida), a historic estate built in Florida in 1929
 Seagate, North Carolina, a community in North Carolina
 One SeaGate, a building in Toledo, Ohio

In Scotland
 Seagate bus station, a station in Dundee
 Seagate Castle, a castle North Ayrshire

Business
 Seagate Technology, a data storage company
 Sea Gate Distributors, a defunct comic book distributor
 Seagate Software, a software company

See also

 Watergate (architecture)
 Gate (water transport)
 
 
 
 
 Gate (disambiguation)
 Sea (disambiguation)
 Oceangate (disambiguation)
 Watergate (disambiguation)